The Gyeongin Line (Gyeonginseon) is a railway mainline in South Korea, currently connecting Guro station in Seoul and Incheon. Commuter services along the line through operates into Seoul Subway Line 1.

History

The Gyeongin Line was the first railway line built on the Korean peninsula. It was opened by the Keijin Railway Company between Noryangjin, on the shore of the Han River across from Seoul, Geumchon, in Incheon, on September 18, 1899. Soon after, the line was extended across the Han River into Seoul Station, and beyond Geumchon to the port of Incheon. When the construction of the Gyeongbu Line was completed from Busan to Guro on January 1, 1905, the Seoul-Guro section of the Gyeongin Line became part of the Gyeongbu Line.

Following the 1961 coup, the Supreme Council for National Reconstruction started South Korea's first five-year plan, which included a construction program to complete the railway network, to foster economic growth. As part of the program, from November 1963, two additional tracks were laid to the north of the existing tracks from Yeongdeungpo station on the Gyeongbu Line to Dongincheon station. The  of new tracks, also called Gyeonginbuk Line, entered service on September 18, 1965.

The  until Juan followed on March 15, 2002, and the final  on December 21, 2005.

Operation
Korail operated regular passenger service along the Gyeongin Line until the electrification of the line in the early 1970s, when passenger service was integrated into Seoul Subway Line 1. Line 1 trains using the Gyeongin Line provide up to ten trains an hour per direction, with services towards Guro, Cheongnyangni, Dongmyo, Seongbuk, Chang-dong, Uijeongbu, Yangju, Dongducheon and Soyosan.

See also
 Transportation in South Korea

References

 
1899 establishments in Korea
rail transport in Gyeonggi Province
rail transport in Incheon
rail transport in Seoul
railway lines in South Korea
railway lines opened in 1899
Seoul Metropolitan Subway lines